Bestial is a 1982 music album by the Spanish group Barrabás. It was the band's eighth and penultimate album, and the last to feature several members including long-time vocalist José Luís Tejada.

Track listing
"The Lion (Don't Kill the Lion)" (Fernando Arbex) – 6:24
"Lover of the Night" (José Maria Moll, José Luis Tejada) – 4:10
"Viva Maria" (Arbex) – 5:56
"Dolores" (Arbex) – 5:08
"(Be My) Rebel" (Arbex) – 6:30
"Love & Hate" (Jesús Gordaliza, Tejada) – 4:08
"So Long" (Moll, Tejada) – 2:55
"Leather Queen" (Arbex, Armando Pelayo) – 3:57
"Big Brother" (Jorge Eduardo Maning) – 4:17

Personnel
José Luis Tejada – vocals, harmonica
Jorge Eduardo "Koky" Maning – guitar, vocals 
Jesús "Susy" Gordaliza – bass guitar, vocals 
Armando Pelayo – keyboards
José María Moll – drums, vocals
Fernando Arbex – production
Sound engineer – Hans Menzel
Sleeve design – Juan Aboli
Recorded at Musicland Studios and Kristian Schultze Studios, Munich

Release information
Spain – Discos Columbia (RCA) TXS-3248
Disconforme DISC 1997CD (2000 CD, re-released 2004)

References
Entry at Allmusic []
Album sleeve notes

1982 albums
Barrabás albums